KUDI (88.7 FM) is a radio station licensed to serve the community of Choteau, Montana. As of December 2019, the station is owned by MOTA Ministries of Fairfield, Montana, and airs a Christian contemporary format.

History
The KUDI call letters were assigned by the FCC on November 10, 2008, to New Life Community Church in Choteau, Montana. (They had previously been used between 1957 and 1976 on 1450 AM in Great Falls.) The new station, located at 88.7 on the FM band, adopted a Christian radio format for talk, news, religious programming, and contemporary Christian music.

On April 14, New Life Community Church donated the call letters, station, and all station assets to MOTA Ministries of Fairfield, Montana. The transaction was consummated on December 4, 2019.

References

External links
 Official Website
 FCC Public Inspection File for KUDI
 

Radio stations established in 2009
2009 establishments in Montana
Contemporary Christian radio stations in the United States
Teton County, Montana
UDI